This is a list of candidates for the 1925 New South Wales state election. The election was held on 30 May 1925. The election was the last of three conducted under the system of proportional representation.

Retiring Members

Nationalist
 Arthur Cocks (North Shore)
 Arthur Grimm (Murrumbidgee)
 Thomas Ley (St George) — retired to contest Barton at the 1925 federal election
 Edward Loxton (Ryde)
 George Nesbitt (Byron)
 Charles Oakes (Eastern Suburbs)
 Reginald Weaver (North Shore)
 James Wilson (Western Suburbs)

Progressive
 Thomas Rutledge (Goulburn)

Others
 John Bailey (Independent, Goulburn) — had been expelled from the Labor Party

Legislative Assembly
Sitting members are shown in bold text. Successful parties are highlighted in the relevant colour. Successful candidates are indicated by an asterisk (*).

See also
 Members of the New South Wales Legislative Assembly, 1925–1927

References
 

1925